Now merely a few buildings, South Spafford retains an old church, no longer in service for that purpose. The last service was held in October 1996 by Rev R. Bob Teachout.  The place is most notable for its scenic situation in the high, remote Coldbrook Valley of the Town of Spafford.

Syracuse metropolitan area
Former populated places in Onondaga County, New York